The rulers of Lorraine have held different posts under different governments over different regions, since its creation as the kingdom of Lotharingia by the Treaty of Prüm, in 855. The first rulers of the newly established region were kings of the Franks. The Latin construction "Lotharingia" evolved over time into "Lorraine" in French, "Lotharingen" in Dutch and "Lothringen" in German. After the Carolingian kingdom was absorbed into its neighbouring realms in the late ninth century, dukes were appointed over the territory. In the mid-tenth century, the duchy was divided into Lower Lorraine and Upper Lorraine, the first evolving into the historical Low Countries, the second became known as the Duchy of Lorraine and existed well into the modern era.

Kings of Lotharingia
Lothair II (855–869)

Charles the Bald claimed Lotharingia on Lothair's death and was crowned king in Metz, but his brother Louis the German opposed his claim and in 870 the Treaty of Mersen divided Lotharingia between the two brothers and subsequently their sons. In 880, the Treaty of Ribemont gave the whole of Lotharingia to Louis the Younger, son of Louis the German.

Charles the Bald (869–870), also king of West Francia and Italy, and Carolingian emperor
Louis the Younger (880–882), also king of Saxony and Bavaria
Charles the Fat (882–887), also king of West Francia, East Francia, Alemannia, Aquitaine and Italy, and Carolingian emperor
Arnulf of Carinthia (887–895), also king of East Francia and Italy, and Carolingian emperor
Zwentibold (895–900)
Louis the Child (900–911), also king of East Francia
Charles the Simple (911–923), also king of West Francia

In 925, Lotharingia was subsumed into East Francia.

Dukes of Lorraine
Gebhard (903–910)
Reginar (910–915)
Gilbert (915–939)
Henry (939–940)
Otto (942–944)
Conrad (944–953)
Bruno, Archbishop of Cologne (953–965)

In 959, Lorraine was divided into two districts, Lower and Upper Lorraine, each governed by a margrave, under Bruno. Upon Bruno's death in 965, both margraves were recognised as dukes of Lower and Upper Lorraine, respectively. The two duchies remained separate, following separate pathways, except for the brief period between 1033 and 1044.

Dukes of Lower Lorraine
Note that the numbering of the dukes varies between sources.

Matfriding dynasty
Godfrey I (959–964)

Carolingian dynasty
Charles (976–991)
Otto (991–1012)

House of Ardennes–Verdun
Godfrey II (1012–1023) (also known as Godfrey I)
Gothelo I (1023–1044) (also duke of Upper Lorraine)
Gothelo II (1044–1046)

House of Luxembourg
Frederick (1046–1065)

House of Ardennes–Verdun
Godfrey III the Bearded (1065–1069) (also known as Godfrey II, previously duke of Upper Lorraine)
Godfrey IV (1069–1076) (also known as Godfrey III)

Salian dynasty
Conrad (1076–1087)

House of Boulogne (Ardennes–Bouillon) 
Godfrey V "of Bouillon" (1087–1100) (also known as Godfrey IV), one of the leaders of the First Crusade and the first ruler of the Kingdom of Jerusalem

House of Limburg 
Henry I (1101–1106)

House of Leuven 
Godfrey I of Leuven (1106–1129) (also known as Godfrey V)

House of Limburg 
Waleran (1129–1139)

House of Leuven 
Godfrey II of Leuven (1139–1142) (also known as Godfrey VI)
Godfrey III of Leuven (1142–1190) (also known as Godfrey VII)

Passes to the Duke of Brabant, who until 1795 kept the title "Duke of Lothier".

Dukes of Upper Lorraine

House of Ardenne–Bar
Frederick I (959–978)
Theodoric I (978–1026/1027)
Frederick II (1026/1027)
Frederick III (1026/1027–1033)

House of Ardenne–Verdun
Gothelo (r. 1033–1044) (also duke of Lower Lorraine).
Godfrey, the Bearded (r. 1044–1046) (later duke of Lower Lorraine)

House of Metz (Ardenne–Metz)

House of Anjou

House of Lorraine

Junior branch of the previous rulers of Ardennes–Metz, known as the House of Lorraine

House of Leszczyński

The House of Habsburg-Lorraine continued carrying the title as titular Dukes of Lorraine.

See also 
Lorraine (duchy)
Lorraine (province)
Lorraine (region)

External links 
Titles of the dukes of Lorraine from contemporary documents with bibliography

Further reading 
Putnam, Ruth. Alsace and Lorraine: From Cæsar to Kaiser, 58 B.C.-1871 A.D. New York: 1915.

History of Lorraine
 
 
Lorraine